Anna Elisabeth "Ans" Panhorst-Niesink (28 October 1918 – 25 July 2010) was a Dutch athlete. She competed at the 1936 and 1948 Summer Olympics in the discus throw and finished in seventh and sixth place, respectively. In 1948 she also competed in the shot put, but failed to reach the final. She finished second and sixth in the discus throw and shot put, respectively, at the 1946 European Athletics Championships.

She was born Anna Niesink, then married and changed her last name to Panhorst-Niesink, and then to Woltman.

Niesink first trained in basketball and sprint, but then shifted to throwing events, in which she soon become a national leader – between 1937 and 1954 she won seven shot put and at least 14 discus titles and held the national records in both events. She continued competing in her forties, winning a medal in the Dutch championships at age 43.

References

External links
Werpen Vrouwen Periode tot 1945
Werpen Vrouwen Periode 1945–1972

1918 births
2010 deaths
Athletes (track and field) at the 1936 Summer Olympics
Athletes (track and field) at the 1948 Summer Olympics
Dutch female discus throwers
Dutch female shot putters
Olympic athletes of the Netherlands
Athletes from Amsterdam
European Athletics Championships medalists